John Dyer (1699–1757) was a painter and Welsh poet.

John Dyer may also refer to:

John Dyer (cyclist), Welsh cyclist
John Dyer (rugby union) (born 1992), Fijian rugby union player
John James Dyer (1809–1855), United States federal judge in Iowa
John Lewis Dyer (1812–1901), Methodist Episcopal clergyman and one of sixteen founders of 19th century Colorado
John Smith alias Dyer (1498/99–1571), MP for Ipswich 1547, 1553 and 1554
John Dyer (14th-century MP), cloth merchant and member of the Parliament of England

See also
John Dyer Baizley, American musician and poet